Raymond Frederick Watters (born 1928) is a New Zealand geographer. He has conducted interdisciplinary studies and projects for UN agencies, British Overseas Development Administration, NZ Aid and governments of a number of developing countries including Solomon Islands, Kiribati, Tuvalu, Mexico, Venezuela, Peru and Papua New Guinea.

In 2009 he was honoured with the Distinguished New Zealand Geography Award.

He specialises in rural development and social change in the developing world, especially in Oceania (South Pacific), Latin America and Guizhou in south-west China. He has also extensively studied shifting agriculture in the hot, wet tropics, human geography and development problems in tribal and peasant societies at micro, meso and macro levels, and the nature of peasantry in the Southern Andes, Peru. Many studies involved geographic, historical, anthropological and economic analyses or synthesis, as well as village fieldwork.

After attaining a bachelor of arts and master of arts (honours) from Auckland and Victoria University Colleges respectively, he completed a Ph.D. at the London School of Economics in 1956 for a thesis on the historical geography of Samoa. He taught at Victoria University of Wellington for 38 years, giving courses on Latin America, historical geography, the Pacific and Chinese peasantry.

Watters led research projects on the Solomon Islands, resulting in three Ph.Ds and four major reports; the Gilbert and Ellice Islands project, yielding three Ph.Ds and six major reports and the Ministry of Foreign Affairs project on Small Island States (with Geoff Bertram), out of which came the MIRAB (migration, remittance, foreign aid, public bureaucracy) model.

Published works

Rural Latin America in Transition: Development and Change in Mexico and Venezuela
 Land and Society in New Zealand: Essays in Historical Geography
 Koro, Economic Development and Social Change in Fiji
 Shifting Cultivation in Latin America
 With W. H. GEDDES, ANNE CHAMBERS, BETSY SEWELL, ROGER LAWRENCE – Atoll Economy: Social Change in Kiribati and Tuvalu
 With I. G. Bertram – New Zealand and its Small island Neighbours. A report of NZ policy towards the Cook Islands, Niue, Tokelau, Kiribati and Tuvalu
 Poverty and Peasantry in Peru's Southern Andes, 1963–90
 With T. G. McGee – Asia Pacific. New Geographies of the Pacific Rim
 Journeys Towards Progress: Essays of a Geographer on Development and Change in Oceania

References

1928 births
Living people
New Zealand geographers
New Zealand writers
Academic staff of the Victoria University of Wellington
University of New Zealand alumni
Alumni of the London School of Economics
New Zealand expatriates in England